Magdalena Martullo-Blocher (née Blocher; born 13 August 1969) is a Swiss businesswoman, politician (SVP), billionaire and the daughter of former Swiss Federal Councillor Christoph Blocher. Her younger brother is Markus Blocher. She is the majority shareholder and executive vice chairman of Ems-Chemie. She has been a member of the National Council for the canton of Graubünden since 2015. She is a prominent member of the Blocher political family.

Early life and education
Martullo-Blocher was born 13 August 1969 in Männedorf, Zürich, Switzerland, the eldest of four children, to Christoph Blocher (b. 1940) and Silvia Blocher (née Kaiser; b. 1945). Her father is a former member of the Federal Council of Switzerland for the Swiss People's Party, who acquired EMS-Chemie in Domat/Ems in 1983 and turned it into a conglomerate. Her personal net worth is estimated by Forbes at $6.5. billion. 

She was primarily raised in Feldmeilen (today part of Meilen) were she attended local public schools before studying Business Administration at the University of St. Gallen graduating with a licentiate degree which would be an equivalent to a Master's degree.

Professional career
From 1994 to 1996, she was Product Manager at Johnson & Johnson. Between 1996 and 2000 she worked as Marketing Manager for the Swiss department at Rivella AG, a soft drink producer.

In January 2001, she joined the Ems Group and eight months later, she became a member of the Board of Directors. Since August 2002, she has been its Vice Chairman. When her father was elected to the Federal Council in the 2003 elections, he handed over his shareholding to his four children. Martullo-Blocher, who was heavily pregnant, took over the management of the company in January 2004. She is now the majority shareholder in the EMS-Chemie corporation. 

According to the Bloomberg Billionaires Index, she ranked 255th on the list of the world's richest people, with an estimated wealth of $9.76 billion.

Political career 
Martullo-Blocher was elected as a member of the National Council in the 2015 Swiss parliamentary elections on a list of the SVP Graubünden. She is active in the Commission for Economic Affairs and Taxation (WAK) and in her electoral district. Since 2018 she is the Vice-President of the SVP. 

She is a member of the Campaign for an Independent and Neutral Switzerland (AUNS).

Political views 
Martello-Blocher is a firm defender of a Swiss neutrality and in view to the Russian Ukrainian conflict, she lamented that Switzerland joined the EU sanctions regime against Russia. Instead she demanded peace negotiations as the sanctions enacted by the European Union (EU) against Russia mainly affected the EU.

Personal life
She is married with three children and lives in Feldmeilen, Switzerland.

References

External links 
 Personal Website

1960s births
Living people
People from Meilen District
Swiss People's Party politicians
21st-century Swiss women politicians
21st-century Swiss politicians
Women members of the National Council (Switzerland)
Members of the National Council (Switzerland)
University of St. Gallen alumni
Campaign for an Independent and Neutral Switzerland
Swiss billionaires